"Doudou" is a song by Malian-French singer Aya Nakamura. It was released on 9 October 2020.

Charts

Certifications

References

2020 singles
2020 songs
Aya Nakamura songs
French-language songs
Songs written by Aya Nakamura